The Treaty of Shackamaxon, also called the Great Treaty and Penn's Treaty, was a legendary treaty between William Penn and Tamanend of the Lenape signed in 1682. Penn and Tamanend agreed that their people would live in a state of perpetual peace.

Description

The site of the treaty was a historic meeting place along the Delaware River used by the Lenape (Delaware) Indians in North America. It was located within what are now the borders of the city of Philadelphia, Pennsylvania, United States. From the Lenape term "Sakimauchheen Ing" (pronounced Sak-i-mauch-heen Ing) which means "to make a chief or king place"; called "Shackamaxon" by the English, Dutch, and Swedes. It was where the Lenapi "crowned" their many family "sakima" (chief) or their three clan "kitakima" (big or clan chief) of the Lenape Nation. Others have interpreted the name to mean "the place of eels", which refers to it as being an important summer fishing spot for the Native Americans. The area is the modern neighborhoods of Fishtown, Kensington, and Port Richmond in Philadelphia.

Purportedly, in late 1682, William Penn made a treaty with the Lenni Lenape under an ancient elm tree. Francis Jennings argues that William Penn very likely signed a treaty, but that his less scrupulous sons, William Jr., John, and Thomas, destroyed the original document. Through such means, according to Jennings, the younger Penns sought to renege on the treaty  to which their father had agreed. Curators of the Philadelphia History Museum at Atwater Kent claim that a wampum belt in their possession serves as authentication that such a meeting did indeed take place. However, the wampum belt cannot prove or disprove whether the Lenni Lenape and the colony came to a formal agreement, and if so, what the provisions of such an agreement entailed.

The legend of such a treaty was immortalized in several works of art (in particular, Benjamin West's paintings) and was mentioned by the French author Voltaire. The legendary elm tree marking the spot blew down in a storm on March 5, 1810.  Its location was memorialized by the placing of an obelisk in 1827 by the Penn Society. The legendary event was further memorialized by the founding of a park in 1893, known as Penn Treaty Park.

Six Swedish families were recorded as living in this area before Penn's arrival.  The Swedes sold out to the new English settlers.  In the 18th century, the territory of Shackamaxon was developed as part of the Port Richmond, Fishtown, and Kensington sections of Philadelphia. Today there is a Shackamaxon Street in Philadelphia which runs several blocks through Fishtown.

The Pennsylvania Historical and Museum Commission refers to the Shackamaxon treaty on its website.

See also

References

External links

Pennsylvania Historical and Museum Commission: Shackamaxon Treaty history website.
Penn Treaty Museum

History of Philadelphia
Lenape
Native American populated places
Native American tribes in Pennsylvania
Former populated places in Pennsylvania
Native American history of Pennsylvania